Based on a book written by Ellen Byerrum (Crimes of Fashion), Killer Hair (also known as Crimes of Fashion: Killer Hair) is a television film that aired on the Lifetime Movie Network in 2009. The storyline follows a fashion journalist, Lacey Smithsonian, as she investigates the discovery of a dead body inside her friend's Washington, DC hair salon.

Synopsis
The story begins with the discovery of an emerging fashion stylist's dead body. Angie Woods, a stylist recognized for succeeding with difficult rejuvenation jobs, is found dead with a razor in her hand. Investigators suggest that Woods committed suicide because of the unattractive hairstyle she was wearing. Smithsonian (Maggie Lawson), a fashion columnist and amateur private investigator, is an acquaintance of Woods and suspects something more sinister; she believes that a notable client of Woods, a congressional staffer with a salacious web site, is somehow implicated. Detective Vic Donovan (Victor Webster) is assigned to the case. This causes complications due to his prior romantic affair with Smithsonian.

Cast and characters
 Lacey Smithsonian - Maggie Lawson
 Stella Lake - Sadie LeBlanc
 Brooke Barton - Sarah Edmondson
 Vic Donovan - Victor Webster
 Mac - James McDaniel
 Tony Trujillo - Mark Consuelos
 Felicity Pickles - Jocelyne Loewen
 Detective Harding - Jason Schombing
 Agent Thorn - Peter Kelamis
 Josette Radford - Finola Hughes
 Boyd Radford - Christopher Shyer
 Beau Radford - Christopher Jacot
 Marcia Robinson - Lynda Boyd
 Rose Smithsonian - Mary McDonnell
 Charise Smithsomian - Katharine Isabelle
 Sherri Gold - Carmen Moore
 Tammi - Sarah Smyth

Sequel
A sequel based on another book by Byerrum, Hostile Makeover, was televised seven days after this film, on June 28, 2009.

Release formats
The film was released on DVD in various countries and an iTunes version was available exclusively in the United States.

References

External links

2009 television films
2009 films
Lifetime (TV network) films
Films based on American novels
Films based on mystery novels
Films set in Washington, D.C.